Pinu may refer to:

People
 Pinu Khan (born 1954), Bangladeshi politician

Places
 Pinu, Papua New Guinea
 
 Ta' Pinu, Malta

Other
 PINU or Innovation and Unity Party